The Zhou family of Runan was a notable Chinese family which descended from Ji Lie (姬烈), the youngest son of King Ping of the Zhou dynasty in 8th century BCE China. Ji Lie's fief was at Runan County, which became the ancestral home of his descendants. Zhou Yong (周邕), an 18th-generation descendant of Ji Lie, is considered the founding father of the Zhou family of Runan. During the Eastern Jin dynasty, the Zhou family of Runan had their home located in the north of the Huai River region. The Zhou family of Runan continued to maintain its influence after the Tang dynasty.

References

Chinese clans